Rolling in Money is a 1934 British comedy film directed by Albert Parker and starring Isabel Jeans, Leslie Sarony and John Loder.  It was made at Ealing Studios  by the British subsidiary of Fox Film. It was not a quota quickie like much of the subsidiary's output at the time. It was an adaptation of the play Mr. Hopkinson by R. C. Carton.

Synopsis
The screenplay concerns an impoverished duchess who arranges a marriage for her daughter to a wealthy working-class London barber.

Cast
 Isabel Jeans as Duchess of Braceborough
 Leslie Sarony as  Hopkinson
 John Loder as  Lord Gawthorpe
 Horace Hodges as Earl of Addleton
 Lawrence Grossmith as Duke of Braceborough
 Garry Marsh as Dursingham
 Anna Lee as Lady Eggleby
 René Ray as Eliza Dibbs
 C. M. Hallard as Carter
 Frank Atkinson as Wiggins

References

Bibliography
 Low, Rachael. Filmmaking in 1930s Britain. George Allen & Unwin, 1985.
 Wood, Linda. British Films, 1927-1939. British Film Institute, 1986.

External links

1934 films
1934 comedy films
British comedy films
Films directed by Albert Parker
British black-and-white films
1930s English-language films
1930s British films
Ealing Studios films
Fox Film films
Films set in London
British films based on plays
Quota quickies